Arsaki is a rural locality (a hamlet) in Slednevskoye Rural Settlement, Alexandrovsky District, Vladimir Oblast, Russia. The population was 86 as of 2010. There are 5 streets.

Geography 
Arsaki is located 24 km west of Alexandrov (the district's administrative centre) by road. Arsaki (settlement) is the nearest rural locality.

References 

Rural localities in Alexandrovsky District, Vladimir Oblast
Alexandrovsky Uyezd (Vladimir Governorate)